Bishopsgarth is a west Stockton area in the borough of Stockton-on-Tees, County Durham, England. It is part of Bishopsgarth and Elm Tree Ward, which had a population of 6,689 in the 2011 census. It is near Hardwick and Fairfield. The area has a shopping parade and the Outwood Academy Bishopsgarth.

See also 
 Bishop Auckland
 Diocese of Durham

References 

 1 "Neighbourhood Statistics", National Statistics. Accessed July 23, 2007.
 2 "Darlington and Stockton Times", Election Results. Accessed July 23, 2007.

External links
 Bishopsgarth School Internet Site

Areas of Stockton-on-Tees